Vilainiai Eldership is a Lithuanian eldership, located in the central-northern part of Kėdainiai District Municipality.

Eldership was created in 2001, when Aristava Eldership and part of Kėdainiai City Eldership was merged.

Geography
The territory of Vilainiai Eldership is located mostly in the Nevėžis Plain and the Nevėžis river valley. Relief is mostly flat, cultivated as agriculture lands. Eastern side is covered by forests.

 Rivers: Nevėžis, Malčius, Obelis, Žalesys, Suleva, Alkupis.
 Lakes and ponds: Bubliai Reservoir, Juodkiškiai Reservoir.
 Forests: Lančiūnava-Šventybrastis Forest.
 Protected areas: Lančiūnava Forest Botanical Sanctuary, Šventybrastis Landscape Sanctuary, Lančiūnava Forest Biosphere Polygon.
 Nature monuments: Šventybrastis Oak Trees

Places of interest
Catholic churches in Apytalaukis, Lančiūnava and Šventybrastis
Manors of Lančiūnava, Apytalaukis, Stasinė
Manor sites in Aristavėlė and Zavišinė
Czesław Miłosz and Juozas Urbšys birth places in Šeteniai
The January Uprising rebels graves in Šventybrastis
Former cemetery site in Dvarčininkai
Povilas Lukšys death place in Taučiūnai
Soviet mosaic the "Tree" in Lančiūnava

Populated places 
Following settlements are located in the Vilainiai Eldership (as for the 2011 census):

Villages: Alksnėnai · Apytalaukis · Aristava · Aristavėlė · Bajėniškis · Baliniai · Bičkai · Bubleliai · Bubliai · Bučioniai · Būdai · Daukainiai · Dilgiai · Dvarčininkai · Džiugailiai · Galkantai · Gineitai · Girelė · Grąžčiai · Katkai · Kėžiai · Koliupė · Kūjėnai · Laiveliai · Lančiūnava · Lepšynė · Marijanka · Medvėdai · Melagiai · Melninkai ·Milžemiai · Norušiai · Peiksva · Pliupai · Puplaukiai · Repengiai · Rudžiai · Skerdikai · Stasinė · Stebuliai · Stuobriai · Šeteniai · Šlaitkalnis · Šventybrastis · Taučiūnai · Tiskūnai · Užlukiai · Užmiškis · Valkaičiai · Vasariškiai · Vilainiai · Zavišinė · Zutkiai 
 Hamlets: Antapolis · Gegužinė · Juodkiškiai · Ledai · Pagojys · Pušinė 
 Former settlements: Pracauninkai

References

Elderships in Kėdainiai District Municipality